Asplenium dielfalcatum is a species of fern in the family Aspleniaceae. It is native to Oahu, Hawaii.

Distribution 
This plant is found at elevations between 400 - 1000m.

Status 
It is listed as critically endangered by the IUCN. The species is threatened by invasive species and climate change. It was listed as endangered by the United States Fish and Wildlife Service on October 29, 1991.

References 

dielfalcatum
Flora of Hawaii